Elula Perrin (1929, Hanoi – 22 May 2003, Paris) was a French-Vietnamese writer.

In 1969, she and Aimée Mori founded the Katmandou, the first nightclub for women in Paris. It was closed in 1989.

Works 
Les femmes préfèrent les femmes
Tant qu'il y aura des femmes
Mousson de femmes
Coup de gueule pour l'amour des femmes
Va y avoir mistral: elles ne sont pas toutes gentilles

References

1929 births
2003 deaths
French-language literature of Vietnam
French people of Vietnamese descent
French lesbian writers
French LGBT rights activists
Vietnamese writers
French women writers
20th-century French women
Vietnamese LGBT people
20th-century LGBT people